List of permanent representatives of Ecuador to the United Nations Office at Geneva

The Ecuadorian permanent representative to the United Nations Office at Geneva represents the government in Quito to the intituitons of the United Nations situated in Geneva.

1955: Teodoro Bustamante Muñoz
1971: José Ricardo Martinez Cobo
1976 to 1982: 
1990 to 1995: Eduardo Santos Alvite
1997 to 2000: Luis Gallegos
2003 to 2005: Hernán Escudero Martínez
2008 to 2009: María Fernanda Espinosa
October 2014 to May 2017: María Fernanda Espinosa
: Guillaume Long
: Luis Gallegos
: Emilio Rafael Izquierdo Miño

References 

United Nations Geneva
Permanent Representatives of Ecuador to the United Nations